Wendy's is an American international fast food restaurant chain founded by Dave Thomas on November 15, 1969, in Columbus, Ohio. Its headquarters moved to Dublin, Ohio, on January 29, 2006. As of December 31, 2018, Wendy's was the world's third-largest hamburger fast-food chain with 6,711 locations, following Burger King and McDonald's. On April 24, 2008, the company announced a merger with Triarc Companies Inc., a publicly traded company and the parent company of Arby's. Wendy's headquarters remained in Dublin. Following the merger, Triarc became known as Wendy's/Arby's Group, and later as the Wendy's Company.

As of December 31, 2018, there are a total of 6,711 Wendy's outlets, including 353 that are company-owned and 6,358 that are franchised; 92% of all the locations are in North America. While the company determines standards for each store's exterior appearance, food quality, and menu, the store owners have control over hours of operations, interior decor, pricing, staff uniforms, and wages.

The chain is known for its square hamburger patties served on circular buns, sea salt fries, and the Frosty, a form of soft-serve ice cream mixed with starches. Wendy's menu consists primarily of hamburgers, chicken sandwiches, French fries, and beverages such as the Frosty. Since phasing out their Big Classic, the company does not have a signature sandwich, such as the Burger King Whopper or the McDonald's Big Mac.

History

Wendy's "old-fashioned" hamburgers were inspired by Dave Thomas's trips to Kewpee Hamburgers in his home town of Kalamazoo, Michigan. Kewpee sold square hamburgers and thick malt shakes. Thomas founded Wendy's in Columbus, Ohio, in 1969 and featured square patties with corners that stuck out from the sides of the circular bun, giving the impression of an abundance of good quality meat. The Columbus location later added a Tim Hortons and was closed on March 2, 2007, after 38 years of business, due to declining sales. Basketball star John Havlicek, an Ohio State University alumnus, was one of Thomas's earliest investors, which eventually gave Havlicek enough of an income stream to retire comfortably.

Thomas named the restaurant after his fourth child Melinda Lou "Wendy" Thomas. Photographs of her were on display at the original Wendy's restaurant until it closed. In his autobiography, Thomas wrote that he regretted naming the restaurant after his daughter because once it became a fast food empire she "lost some of her privacy" with many people assuming she was the official company spokesperson. In August 1972, the first Wendy's franchisee, L.S. Hartzog, signed an agreement for Indianapolis, Indiana. Also, in 1972, Wendy's aired its first TV commercials that were only broadcast locally in Ohio. This series of commercials was titled "C'mon to Wendy's" because they stressed Wendy's superiority through the "Quality Is Our Recipe" slogan and featured an animated Wendy similar to the one from the corporate logo along with dancing hamburgers.

The first Canadian restaurant opened in Hamilton, Ontario, in 1976. In December 1976, Wendy's opened its 500th restaurant, located in Toronto. In March 1978, Wendy's opened its 1000th restaurant in Springfield, Tennessee.

Wendy's founded the fried chicken chain Sisters Chicken & Biscuits in 1978 and sold it to its largest franchiser in 1987. In the 1970s Wendy's opened in Australia but by 1986 almost all of their Australian stores had been purchased by Hungry Jack's, the Australian franchisee of Burger King, but on May 13, 2021, Wendy's opened a pop-up store in The Rocks in Sydney's city centre for a day. In 1979, the first European Wendy's opened in Munich, West Germany. Wendy's entered the Asian market by opening its first restaurants in Japan in 1980, in Hong Kong in 1982, and in the Philippines and Singapore in 1983. In 1984, Wendy's opened its first restaurant in South Korea. 

The chain opened locations in the former West Germany in the 1980s in cities like Mannheim, Heidelberg and Munich and other areas where the US maintained Army bases. When the troops were removed after German reunification in the early 1990s, these Wendy's stores were closed.

In response to a 1986 slowdown in the chain's performance, Wendy's restructured its cleanliness standards, menu, and other operational details to ensure that stores met the goals and standards of the parent company so that its franchises were competitive in the market. Wendy's closed all its outlets in Hong Kong in 1986 and in Singapore in the following year.

From 1988 to 1990, Wendy's expanded operations globally to Mexico, New Zealand, Indonesia, Greece, Turkey, Guatemala, as well as the U.S. Naval Base in Naples, Italy. In 1988, Wendy's expanded its bar to a full-blown buffet called the Superbar for $2.99. The Superbar had various stations: "Mexican Fiesta", the Italian "Pasta Pasta," and the "Garden Spot", salad and fruit. The Superbar was popular but difficult to maintain and thus was discontinued in 1998.

In 1989, Wendy's opened its first restaurant in Greece at Syntagma Square being the first foreign fast-food chain in the country. After opening 12 restaurants in 3 cities, the company abandoned the Greek market in 2002 due to differences with the local franchisee, although it was a very successful and profitable business at the time. In 1996, the chain expanded in Argentina by opening 18 local restaurants. However, all of them closed only four years later due to the economic crisis in the country. In 1998, Wendy's pulled out of South Korea by closing all its 15 restaurants and in 2000 exited from the UK, Argentina, and Hong Kong.

Garden Sensations salads were added in 2002. Wendy's signed a franchise agreement to re-enter the Singapore market in 2009, though that agreement was short-lived; in April 2015, Wendy's once again ceased operation in the country and closed all the restaurants.

In 2011, Wendy's returned to Japan and Argentina announcing a development agreement for 50 restaurants in the country. It also entered the Russian market for the first time with plans to open 180 restaurants over a 10-year period. However, only three years later, in 2014, Wendy's closed all its restaurants in the country.

In 2013, Wendy's opened the first restaurant in Georgia and made a deal to open 25 restaurants in Georgia and the Republic of Azerbaijan. In September 2014, several pork-based products were introduced to be on sale until early November. These included a standard pulled pork sandwich with slaw and three sauce options, a BBQ Pulled Pork Cheeseburger and cheese fries with pulled pork, cheddar cheese sauce, onions, and barbecue sauce. In May 2015, Wendy's announced they would be expanding into India, with its first outlet located in Gurgaon.

In September 2016, JAE Restaurant Group acquired 97 Wendy's restaurants throughout the South Florida region. JAE Restaurant Group is one of the country's largest franchisee owners. The Group owns 177 Wendy's Restaurants. Wendy's Co. has been looking to remodel existing stores and upgrade the curb appeal of its locations. They have been doing this by adding fireplaces, more seating options, adding WiFi and flat-screen TVs, and digital menus.

In 2017, the company sold 540 of its restaurants. The divesture was the second step in a three-step action plan to improve the brand. Other steps include new openings and remodeling of existing stores. In 2015, the brand opened 80 new restaurants and remodeled 450 of its existing locations. The brand's goal is to remodel at least 60% of its North American locations by year-end 2020.

In December 2017, Wendy's announced a partnership with DoorDash for food delivery in the U.S.

In October 2019, Wendy's announced that it was returning to the UK market, which it had served from 1980 to 1986, then again from 1992 to 2000. The first of 20 planned restaurants was due to open in 2020 in Stoke-on-Trent, but it was later announced that the first location would be Reading, Berkshire. The Reading restaurant opened on June 2, 2021.

In January 2021, Wendy's announced that after the bankruptcy of franchisee NPC Quality Burgers Inc., half of NPC's outlets would be bought by Flynn Restaurant.

In 2023, Wendy's announced that they would be returning to Australia with hundreds of locations set to open across the country. The chain previously operated in Australia from the 1970s until it was closed in 1986. However, the US Burger giant has already run into a potential issue with the trademark to Wendy's name already owned by a different fast foot outlet named Wendy's Milk Bar which opened in 1979 and has been operating in the country for over 40 years.

Wendy's by country and continent

Asia

 India
 Indonesia (since 1990; acquired by Trans Corp as of 2013)
 Japan (since 1980; closed 2009–11; now co-branded Wendy's First Kitchen)
 Kazakhstan
 Kuwait
 Philippines (since 1982)
 Qatar
 United Arab Emirates
 Uzbekistan (first location in Central Asia)

Europe

 Georgia (since 2013; first location in the Caucasus)
 United Kingdom (reopened in June 2021)
 Ireland (reopened in 2022)

North America

 Aruba
 The Bahamas
 Canada (since 1976, first location outside the United States)
 Cayman Islands
 Curaçao
 Dominican Republic
 El Salvador
 Guatemala
 Honduras
 Jamaica
 Mexico
 Panama
 Puerto Rico
 Trinidad and Tobago
 United States (since 1969)

Oceania

 Guam
 New Zealand

South America 

 Argentina (returned in 2011)
 Ecuador
 Chile

Former locations

 Australia (1970s-1986, returning in 2023)
 Brazil (2016–2019)
 Costa Rica (2005–2015)
 Germany
 Greece (1989–2002)
 Hong Kong (1982–1986, Then again in 1992–2000)
 Hungary (1994–2002)
 Israel (operated for a few years from 1987)
 Italy
 Malaysia (2008–2019)
 Netherlands
 Russia (2011–2014)
 Singapore (1982-1987, 2009–2015)
 South Africa
 South Korea (1984–1998)
 Spain (1980–2000), known from the 90s as Welcome.
 Switzerland
 Taiwan
 Thailand
 Turkey
 Venezuela

Menu

Wendy's offers two different hamburger patties, a "Junior"  patty and a "Single"  patty. The 4-ounce patties are sold in single, double, and triple configurations, and the 1.78-ounce ones in single and double. Originally, Wendy's had only two kinds of chicken sandwiches, fried and grilled. The spicy chicken sandwich started out as a promotion. It was later put on the menu full-time in 1996 because of its popularity and its ease of preparation; it used the same condiments as the standard fried chicken sandwich.

The Frescata line of sandwiches also went from being promotional items to main menu items; after going through several revisions, the Turkey and Swiss and the Ham and Swiss were put on the menu full-time. They were discontinued in mid-December 2007. Occasionally, some Wendy's restaurants offer a fried fish sandwich.

In 1988, Wendy's was the first fast-food chain to create a single-price-point "value menu" where all items listed on that menu were priced exclusively at 99¢. That menu was modified in 2007, with prices ranging from 99¢ to $2.00.

Breakfast
Wendy's served breakfast beginning in 1985, but that endeavor proved unsuccessful. In mid-2007, Wendy's started serving breakfast again in its U.S. and some Canadian locations. While approximately 12 Wendy's restaurants in the U.S. and its territories have been serving breakfast since 2006, Wendy's has not had a company-wide breakfast offering.

The 2007 breakfast menu is different from the ones featured in 1985, and is structured similarly to the lunch/dinner menu, with "value meals" and various sides like blended fruit. Menu items include several breakfast sandwiches served on biscuits, "frescuits", and Kaiser rolls, breakfast burritos, and side orders of hash browns, muffins, and cinnamon sticks. To avoid problems encountered with the 1985 breakfast, the 2007 menu was designed for ease of operation, lower cost, and reduced preparation time.

In January 2016, Wendy's announced a transition plan to serve only cage-free eggs by 2020 in all U.S. and Canadian locations that serve breakfast.

In September 2019, Wendy's announced it would launch a nationwide breakfast menu in March 2020, including a breakfast version of its Baconator, a Frosty-inspired coffee drink, and a honey butter chicken biscuit. That menu includes 19 items.

Notable menu items

 Baked potato –  No other major fast food chain offers baked potatoes, which Wendy's offers with a variety of toppings. Baked potatoes were added to the menu in 1983 as a lower-fat alternative to French fries.
 Chili – Wendy's has offered chili since opening its first restaurant. Cooked hamburger patties that are not sold promptly are chopped up and used in the chili, which is considered a lower-calorie menu option.
 Frosty dessert – a frozen dairy dessert created by Thomas at his first restaurant by blending chocolate and vanilla ice cream, and intended to be thick enough to require a spoon to eat.
 Dave's – In late 2011, Wendy's altered the recipe for their Single, Double, and Triple burgers, which had been staples on the menu for decades, to rerelease each as part of the new Dave's Hot 'N Juicy line. They were constructed from the same basic patty (and the words "Single," "Double," and "Triple" were retained at the end of the new names), but the patty was now thicker, and its square edges had been rounded off slightly. The cheese began to be stored at a warmer temperature, allowing it to melt more entirely over the patty, alterations were made to the bun, and the selection of produce (red onions replaced white onions), and the condiments now consisted of ketchup and mayonnaise rather than ketchup, mayonnaise, and mustard. They were updated in 2016 and renamed as simply Dave's, now using bakery-style buns.
 Big Classic – A sandwich (no longer available in US stores) that directly competed with the Burger King Whopper. Mayonnaise, lettuce, tomato, pickles, ketchup, and onions served on a Kaiser-style roll. A second version with bacon was available, called the Big Bacon Classic, which was replaced with the Bacon Deluxe in 2009 when the Applewood Smoked Bacon was introduced.
 Baconator – Single Baconator is one quarter-pound patty topped with mayonnaise, ketchup, three strips of bacon, and two slices of cheese; Double Baconator has mayonnaise, ketchup, six strips of bacon, two  patties, and three slices of American cheese; and the Triple Baconator (1360 Calories or kilocalories) is three quarter-pound patties with nine strips of bacon, four slices of cheese, ketchup, and mayonnaise.
 Bacon Mushroom Melt – is a beef hamburger featuring smoked bacon, portobello mushrooms and cheddar cheese sauce. It was first available in the early 1990s and was very popular in some countries across the world like Greece and Philippines. In later years in some countries it is referred to as the Baconator Mushroom Melt or the Bacon Portabella Mushroom Melt with an extra slice of cheese.
 Ciabatta Bacon Cheeseburger – Introduced in January 2014, the Ciabatta Bacon Cheeseburger is made with a quarter-pound beef patty, aged Asiago cheese, thick-cut applewood smoked bacon, rosemary garlic aïoli, and roasted tomatoes. At launch, the sandwich was priced at $4.79 in the United States and was part of a strategy to market higher-priced menu items to help position Wendy's as a premium fast-food chain. Wendy's advertised the sandwich as a limited-time product that would be withdrawn in March 2014. According to the company, the sandwich has 670 calories. The debut of the burger received positive reviews. Syndicated fast food columnist Ken Hoffman called the burger "another winner" and "worth the carbs," while the Phoenix New Times declared it was "one of the better burgers in the entire fast-food industry." Reviewers at the Sioux City Journal offered more mixed evaluations, with only two of four taste testers saying they would be likely to try the burger a second time.
 Black bean burger – Wendy's and a number of major fast-food chains have been targeted for decades for meatless entrees, typically, meatless 'veggieburgers' – and Wendy's response is the black bean burger (still in 'beta' testing in Salt Lake City, Utah; Columbus, Ohio; and Columbia, South Carolina). Its major ingredients are black beans, wild rice, farro, onions, brown rice, carrots, quinoa, corn, green bell peppers, and red bell peppers; and the sauce and seasonings include red wine vinegar, chili peppers, cumin, cilantro, oregano, and sea salt.

Food safety 
In 2015, Wendy's had two food safety incidents involving foreign objects in food at their restaurants in Gurgaon, India.

In late August 2022, 97 persons reported getting sick after eating sandwiches containing romaine lettuce at Wendy's restaurants in the U.S. states of Indiana, Michigan, Ohio, Pennsylvania, New York and Kentucky. The Centers for Disease Control and Prevention never could officially identify the specific source of the E. coli outbreak, but Wendy's removed romaine lettuce from the affected restaurants. In October 2022, the Centers for Disease Control and Prevention declared the E. coli outbreak was over, stating that at least 109 people had been impacted. Of those cases, 52 people had been admitted to hospitals and 13 had developed hemolytic uremic syndrome.

Advertising

After successful early growth of the chain, sales flattened as the company struggled to achieve brand differentiation in the highly competitive fast-food market. This situation would turn around in the mid-1980s. Starting on January 9, 1984, elderly actress Clara Peller was featured in the successful "Where's the beef?" North American commercial campaign written by Cliff Freeman. Her famous line quickly entered the American pop culture (it was even used by Walter Mondale in a debate with Gary Hart in the Democratic primary election) and served to promote Wendy's hamburgers. Peller, age 83, was dropped from the campaign in 1985 because she performed in a commercial for Prego spaghetti sauce, saying "I found it, I really found it", a phrase alluding to the beef in the listener's mind.

Peller was soon after replaced by Wendy's founder Dave Thomas himself. Soft-spoken and bashful, the "Dave" ads generally focused on Thomas praising his products and offering a commitment to quality service, although there would occasionally be "wackier" ads as well. Thomas ultimately appeared in more than 800 commercials, more than any other company founder in television history.

After Dave Thomas' death in 2002, Wendy's struggled to find a new advertising campaign. After a round of conventional ads describing the food they serve, in 2004 they tried using a character they made called "Mr. Wendy" who claimed to be the unofficial spokesperson for the chain. These proved to be extremely unsuccessful. After seven months, Wendy's returned to an animated campaign focusing on the difference between Wendy's square hamburgers and the round hamburgers of competitors.

Wendy's marketing arm engages in product placement in films and television and is sometimes seen on ABC's reality show Extreme Makeover: Home Edition, serving food to the more than 100 construction workers.

A 2007 Wendy's commercial featured the tune from the Violent Femmes song "Blister in the Sun." The inclusion of the song in the commercial provoked an internal conflict between members of the Violent Femmes, which resulted in a lawsuit between bassist Brian Ritchie and lead singer Gordon Gano that ultimately led to the band disbanding in 2009 (however, they would reunite in 2013).

With their "That's right" ad campaign, not a success, Wendy's unveiled a new ad campaign, featuring the animated version of their mascot voiced by Luci Christian highlighting certain menu items. The new ad campaign made its debut in late January 2008, with slogans: in the USA:
"It's waaaay better than fast food. It's Wendy's." and in Canada, "It's waaaay delicious. It's Wendy's." The company's slogan, "you know when it's real," was introduced in 2010.

In November 2010, a series of commercials aired featuring the company's namesake, Wendy Thomas, which marked the first time she had appeared in a Wendy's advertisement. In April 2012, Morgan Smith Goodwin began appearing as the redhead in ads with the slogan "Now that's better." In 2013, social media advertising featuring Nick Lachey directed at millennials promoted the Pretzel Bacon Cheeseburger.

A 2014 campaign to promote the Tuscan Chicken on Ciabatta sandwich entitled L'Estrella de la Toscana (or "Star of Tuscany" in English) was launched on television and social media.

Slogans

United States – Canada
 1969–present: Quality Is Our Recipe
 1977–1980, 1987: Hot-N-Juicy
 1977: We fix 'em 256 ways (alternate slogan)
 1978–1979: Juicy hamburgers
 1980–1981: Wendy's Has the Taste
 1981–1982: Ain't No Reason to Go Anyplace Else
 1982–1985: You're Wendy's Kind of People
 1983–1985: That's fresh, that's class, that's Wendy's (Canada)
 1983–1984: Parts is parts
 1984–1986: Where's the beef?
 1985–1988: Choose Fresh, choose Wendy's (Originally used alongside "Where's the Beef?")
 1987–1993: Give a little nibble was to be a catchy phrase that would capture the attention of consumers and help make Wendy's a major player on the fast-food scene once again. This television commercial was a flop and sent Wendy's hunting for a new advertising agency. After a poorly received seven-week run, Wendy's pulled the television commercials created by Dick Rich Inc. The "nibble" spots were meant to emphasize Wendy's better-tasting hamburger. They showed customers ripping off chunks of meat from an absurdly large hamburger.
 1988–1992: The best burgers in the business.
 1989–1998: The best burgers and a whole lot more (also was printed inside the hamburger wrappers during the 1990s)
 1996–1998: The Best Burgers Yet!!
 1997–present: You can eat great, even late
 2001–2005: It's hamburger bliss.
 2002–2004: It's better here
 2003–2007: It's Always Great, Even Late. (Canada)
 2004–2007: Do what tastes right. (Primary slogan)
 2005–present: It's good to be square.
 August 2006 – March 2008: That's right.
 August 2006 – March 2008: Uh-Huh.
 2007–2008: Hot Juicy Burgers
 August 2007 – October 2009: It's way better than fast food... It's Wendy's. (United States)
 August 2007 – October 2009: It's way delicious. It's Wendy's. (Canada)
 August 2007 – October 2009: Carrément bon. C'est Wendy's. (EN: "Squarely good. It's Wendy's.") (Quebec, Canada) 
 January 2010 – April 2012: You know when it's real.
 March 2012 – 2016: Now that's better.
 2016–2019: Not just different, deliciously different.
 2019–present: We got you.

Other countries
 1983–present: It's the best time for... Wendy's (Philippines)
 1994 (approx)–2002: Wendy's η τετράγωνη επιλογή (Wendy's the square option) (Greece)
 2000 (approx)–present: Quality is our recipe (Indonesia, New Zealand, Chile & United States)
 2000 (approx)–present: Wendy's cuadra contigo (Wendy's fits with you). The word cuadra (fit) is a reference to the Spanish word cuadrado that means square. (Venezuela)
 2001 (approx)–present: El Sabor de lo Recién Hecho (The Flavor of the Freshly Made) (Honduras)
 2007 (approx)–2009: Wendy's es Sensacional (Wendy's is Sensational) (El Salvador)
 2007 –present: It's not just fast food; it's fresh food, made fast (Malaysia)
 2008–present: Old Fashion Hamburgers (Dominican Republic)
 2009–present: "Wendy's, sabor al cuadrado" (Wendy's, taste to the square) (Mexico)
 2009–present: Es muuuuucho más que comida rápida, es Wendy's (It's waaaaay more than fast food, it's Wendy's.) (El Salvador)

In popular culture
On March 23, 2018, Wendy's released an EP titled We Beefin?, a reference to their 1984 slogan Where's the beef?

On October 3, 2019, Wendy's released a tabletop role-playing game titled Feast of Legends: Rise From the Deep Freeze, in the style of Dungeons & Dragons. A short multi-part adventure was included, pitting Wendy's kingdom against the Ice Jester, a parody of Ronald McDonald, the clown mascot of Wendy's competitor, McDonald's. Critical Role was sponsored for a special event live stream of the game.

See also
 List of hamburger restaurants
 Wendy's High School Heisman (student-athletes in various sports)

References

External links

 Official website

 
Fast-food hamburger restaurants
Fast-food chains of the United States
Fast-food franchises
Restaurant chains in the United States
Multinational food companies
Restaurants established in 1969
Companies based in the Columbus, Ohio metropolitan area
1969 establishments in Ohio
Defunct restaurant chains in Israel
Restaurants in Ohio